Astragalus cibarius, commonly called the browse milkvetch, is a species of plant in the legume family.

It is native to western North America, in the U.S. states of Colorado, Idaho, Montana, Nevada, Utah, and Wyoming. It is a widespread and common species, found in valley floors, plains, and foothills. It is particularly associated with sagebrush, which it often grows under.

It is a perennial that produces pink-purple and white colored flowers in the spring.

References

cibarius